was a village located in Uma District, Ehime Prefecture. On March 31, 1954, the village merged with other villages to become the town of Doi. Currently part of the city of Shikokuchūō.

History
 December 15, 1889 - Due to the municipal status enforcement, the villages of Doi, Urayama, Irino, and Hatano merged to form the village of Doi, Uma District.
 March 31, 1954 - Merged with the villages of Nagatsu, Kofuji, Tenma, Kaburasaki, and Sekigawa to become the town of Doi.
 April 1, 2004 - The town of Doi merged with the village of Shingū and the cities of Kawanoe and Iyomishima to become the city of Shikokuchūō.

See also
 List of dissolved municipalities of Japan

Dissolved municipalities of Ehime Prefecture
Populated places in Ehime Prefecture